The Minister of Foreign Affairs was a government minister in charge of the Ministry of Foreign Affairs of South Yemen (common name for the People's Democratic Republic of Yemen), in what is now southern Yemen. The Minister was responsible for conducting foreign relations of the country.

List of ministers
The following is a list of foreign ministers of South Yemen from 1967 until the unification in 1990:

For ministers of foreign affairs of unified Yemen after 1990, see Ministry of Foreign Affairs (Yemen).

See also
 Minister of Foreign Affairs of North Yemen

References

 
South Yemen
South Yemen
1967 establishments in South Yemen
1990 disestablishments in Yemen